Diane Luckey (December 12, 1960 – July 19, 2022), known professionally as Q Lazzarus, was an American singer. She is best known for her 1988 song "Goodbye Horses", which became a cult classic after being prominently featured in a scene from Jonathan Demme's 1991 film The Silence of the Lambs. Several of her songs were featured in other films directed by Demme before she disappeared from the public eye in the mid-1990s.

Life and career
Diane Luckey was born on December 12, 1960, in Neptune Township, New Jersey, the youngest of seven children. While attending the Mount Pisgah Baptist Church in Neptune as a child, she sang in the Mount Pisgah Youth Choir. She graduated from Neptune High School and, inspired by a production of Bubbling Brown Sugar on Broadway, moved to New York City at age 18 to pursue a music career. She soon started working as a backup singer and jingle writer at Sigma Sound Studios. 

In the 1980s, while making music as part of her band Q Lazzarus and the Resurrection, Q Lazzarus was working as a taxi driver in New York City to make a living. The band consisted of Q Lazzarus, songwriter William Garvey, backup singer Gloriana Galicia, Janice Bernstein, and Mark Barrett. According to Galicia, by 1985, Q Lazzarus was working in Chelsea as a live-in housekeeper and au pair for an English businessman named Swan, and the band would record vocal harmonies on cassette at Swan's house; Q Lazzarus also had a number of other day jobs at the time. 

Q Lazzarus was repeatedly turned away by record companies, who insisted they could not market her because of her dreadlocks. After picking up filmmaker Jonathan Demme in her taxi during a blizzard and asking him if he was in the music business, Q Lazzarus played him her demo tape, to which he replied, "Oh my God, what is this and who are you?" Her song "Candle Goes Away" was then included in Demme's 1986 film Something Wild. In the late 1980s, she moved to London to form an Aerosmith-style rock band and stayed there for five years.

In 1988, Q Lazzarus's signature song, "Goodbye Horses", written and produced by Garvey, was released. That same year, the song was included in Demme's film Married to the Mob. It later became a cult hit following its inclusion in a scene from Demme's 1991 film The Silence of the Lambs featuring the film's antagonist, serial killer Buffalo Bill. Q Lazzarus then appeared in Demme's next film, 1993's Philadelphia, in which she performed a cover of the Talking Heads song "Heaven".

In 1996, Q Lazzarus and the Resurrection disbanded and Q Lazzarus disappeared from the public eye. , she had been working as a bus driver in Staten Island, and filed a lawsuit against a Hasidic bus company for not hiring female bus drivers. In August 2019, filmmaker Eva Aridjis met Q Lazzarus after getting picked up in her car service in New York City, and the two soon began working on a documentary about Luckey's life, Goodbye Horses: The Many Lives of Q Lazzarus, which is set to be released in 2023.

Q Lazzarus died on July 19, 2022, due to an unknown illness.

References

External links
 

1960 births
2022 deaths
20th-century American singers
20th-century American women singers
20th-century African-American women singers
American taxi drivers
Bus drivers
Neptune High School alumni
People from Neptune Township, New Jersey
People from Staten Island
Singers from New Jersey
Singers from New York City
21st-century African-American people
21st-century African-American women
Jingle writers